Bohanon is a surname. Notable people with the surname include:

Brian Bohanon (born 1968), American baseball player
Eunice Blake Bohanon (1904–1997), American children's book editor, philanthropist
George Bohanon (born 1937), American jazz trombonist and session musician
Gerry Bohanon (born 1999), American football player
Luther L. Bohanon (1902–2003), American judge
Tommy Bohanon (born 1990), American football player